The Association for the Promotion of the Unity of Christendom (APUC) was a Christian ecumenical organization established by Ambrose Lisle March Phillipps De Lisle in 1857 in England to promote unity among Anglicans, Roman Catholics, and Orthodox Christians. It was condemned by Cardinal Nicholas Wiseman and defunct by the early twentieth century. A successor organization, the Catholic League (English) has continuity with it.

See also
Order of Corporate Reunion

References
Purcell, Edmund Sheridan. Life and Letters of Ambrose Phillipps de Lisle, Macmillan and Co., Ltd., London, 1900

External links
Bibliographic directory at Project Canterbury

1857 establishments in England
Anglican organizations established in the 19th century
Anglo-Catholicism
Catholic–Protestant ecumenism
Church of England societies and organisations
Religious organizations established in 1857
Christian ecumenical organizations